Tropidomarga biangulata is a species of sea snail, a marine gastropod mollusk in the family Turbinidae, the turban snails.

Description
The size of the shell attains 15 mm.

Distribution
This marine species occurs off the South Georgia Islands.

References

 Powell, A.W.B. 1951. Antarctic and Subantarctic Mollusca: Pelecypoda and Gastropoda. Discovery Reports, 26: 47-196.
 A. W. B. Powell, Mollusca of Antarctic and Subantarctic Seas; Biogeography and Ecology in Antarctica, Monographiae Biologicae Volume 15, 1965, pp 333–380

External links
 To Antarctic Invertebrates
 To Biodiversity Heritage Library (2 publications)
 To Encyclopedia of Life
 To USNM Invertebrate Zoology Mollusca Collection
 To World Register of Marine Species
 

biangulata
Gastropods described in 1951